The Tilt Train is the name for two similar high-speed tilting train services, one electric and the other diesel, operated by Queensland Rail. They run on the North Coast line from Brisbane to Bundaberg and Rockhampton (electric) and Cairns (diesel).

History

Rockhampton

Commencing in 1998, the Electric Tilt Train operates from Brisbane to Rockhampton. The train operates on the North Coast line and serves the intermediate towns of Gympie, Maryborough, Bundaberg and Gladstone. The electric Tilt Trains run in a multiple unit configuration.

The Electric Tilt Train features 2×2 economy seating, and 1×2 business class seating, mainscreen visual entertainment along with in-seat audio entertainment. Economy class passengers have a regular trolley service and a buffet style galley food service, while business class has a frequent trolley service and passenger attendants to tend to the needs of the passengers.

Cairns

The Diesel Tilt Train, operating from Brisbane to Cairns, features a 2×2 premium economy class seating arrangement, 1×2 business class seating arrangement (Railbed), in-seat audio and visual entertainment and a TV screen attached to the headrest of the seat in front. A trolley service is available in the Railbed carriages, and a club car is available 24 hours. In October 2013 when the first refurbished set returned to traffic, the service was named the Spirit of Queensland.

In 2014 an additional train was delivered to replace The Sunlander between Brisbane and Cairns, meaning the only service on this 1681km route since that time has been the Spirit of Queensland.

Awards 
In 2009 as part of the Q150 celebrations, the Tilt Train was announced as one of the Q150 Icons of Queensland for its role as an iconic "innovation and invention".

Notes and references

External links
Tilt Train
Flickr gallery

High-speed rail in Australia
Named passenger trains of Queensland
Tilting trains